The Tagum City Flyover is an overpass along the Pan-Philippine Highway (Davao–Agusan National Highway) in Tagum, Davao del Norte. It carries traffic of Pan-Philippine Highway crossing its junction with Surigao–Davao Coastal Road (locally known as Apokon Road) and Tagum–Panabo Circumferential Road (locally known as Pioneer Avenue).

Construction
The Tagum City Flyover is a national project lobbied by then-House Speaker Pantaleon Alvarez. The overpass would be the first in Tagum. Construction began in November 2017.

The project was met with some opposition, with critics insists that other issues of Davao del Norte, like frequent flooding should have been prioritized instead. Opposition included those from the city's business sector. In response to skepticism to the flyover project, the Department of Public Works and Highways's Davao office said that the overpass is meant to address the anticipated growth of Tagum's economy.

By July 2020, the flyover is already 84.23% complete. The flyover was opened on October 4, 2021 and later inaugurated on November 20, 2021.

Specifications
It was built along the Davao–Agusan portion of the Pan-Philippine Highway and crosses most especially the Tagum Junction, its intersection with Surigao–Davao Coastal Road (locally known as Apokon Road) and Tagum–Panabo Circumferential Road (locally known as Pioneer Avenue), in Tagum's central business district.

References

Road interchanges in the Philippines
Buildings and structures in Tagum